Ian Herbers (born July 18, 1967) is a Canadian former professional ice hockey defenceman, and former assistant coach for the Edmonton Oilers of the National Hockey League.

Draft
Herbers was drafted in the tenth round, 190th overall, by the Buffalo Sabres in the 1987 NHL Entry Draft.

Career
Herbers played four seasons in the Western Hockey League where he was coached by Graham James and played with Joe Sakic. This was followed by four seasons with the University of Alberta Golden Bears,  where he earned a bachelor's degree in physical education and won the national championship in 1992. He made his pro debut with the Cape Breton Oilers, with whom he won the Calder Cup of the American Hockey League in the 1992–93 season. He made it to the NHL in the 1993–94 season, appearing in 22 games with the Edmonton Oilers.

Herbers would not find his way to the NHL again until the 1999–2000 season with the Tampa Bay Lightning. The Lightning then traded him to the New York Islanders on March 9, 2000, in exchange for a seventh-round pick in the 2000 NHL Entry Draft.

After finishing the season with the Islanders, Herbers was left unprotected in the 2000 NHL Expansion Draft and was picked by the Minnesota Wild. After spending the 2000–01 season with the Wild's International Hockey League affiliate, the Cleveland Lumberjacks, Herbers went to Great Britain. He played for the Ayr Scottish Eagles of the British Ice Hockey Superleague for one season and the Guildford Flames of the British National League for another. He briefly returned to North American hockey in the 2003–04 season, playing in four games for the United Hockey League's Flint Generals, before retiring.

Coaching career
Herbers became an assistant coach with the AHL San Antonio Rampage in 2004 before the lockout. From the AHL, Herbers then moved to the Saginaw Spirit of the Ontario Hockey League (OHL) in 2005. He spent two years there, before being named the head coach of the ECHL's Johnstown Chiefs in 2007. On 5 August 2009, he became an assistant coach with the Milwaukee Admirals of the American Hockey League. On November 28, 2011, after the departure of Kirk Muller to the Carolina Hurricanes, Herbers was named head coach of the Milwaukee Admirals. In late May 2012 Herbers left the Milwaukee Admirals to begin coaching the men's hockey team at his alma mater, the University of Alberta.

He spent three seasons as head coach of the Alberta Golden Bears, earning Canada West Coach of the Year honours in his inaugural season and leading the team to three Canada West conference championships and consecutive Canadian Interuniversity Sport (CIS) national championships in 2013-14 and 2014-15.

Herbers also served as a coach for Team Canada at the 2015 IIHF U18 World Championship, where they won a bronze medal.

Herbers was hired as an assistant coach by the Edmonton Oilers in July 2015. The Oilers relieved Herbers of his coaching duties on April 27, 2018. Herbers returned as head coach of the University of Alberta Golden Bears hockey program on July 1, 2018.

Career statistics

Regular season and playoffs

External links

References

1967 births
Living people
Alberta Golden Bears ice hockey players
Ayr Scottish Eagles players
Buffalo Sabres draft picks
Canadian ice hockey defencemen
Cape Breton Oilers players
Cleveland Lumberjacks players
Detroit Vipers players
Edmonton Oilers coaches
Edmonton Oilers players
English Premier Ice Hockey League players
Flint Generals players
Guildford Flames players
Ice hockey people from Alberta
Ice Hockey Superleague players
Johnstown Chiefs coaches
Kelowna Wings players
Lethbridge Broncos players
Milwaukee Admirals coaches
New York Islanders players
People from Jasper, Alberta
Spokane Chiefs players
Swift Current Broncos players
Tampa Bay Lightning players
Canadian expatriate ice hockey players in England
Canadian expatriate ice hockey players in Scotland
Canadian ice hockey coaches
Canadian expatriate ice hockey players in the United States